Christos Palaiologos (1950 – 30 August 2009) was a Greek politician. He was born in Livadeia, and studied as a civil engineer in the Polytechnic School of the Aristotle University of Thessaloniki. He was the Mayor of Livadeia from 1990 to 2002, and a major figure in the leadership of the Coalition of Left, of Movements and Ecology.

References

1950 births
2009 deaths
People from Livadeia
Coalition of Left, of Movements and Ecology politicians